Feihe is a town in Qiaocheng District, Bozhou, Anhui. , it administers one residential neighborhood (Feihe) and the following nine villages:
Fanqiao Village
Fengwa Village
Lixiaomiao Village
Luoji Village
Sili Village
Dianji Village
Dakang Village
Liyao Village
Yangzhuang Village

References

Bozhou
Township-level divisions of Anhui